Rambouillet is a railway station serving Rambouillet, a southwestern suburb of Paris, France. It is on the Paris–Brest railway, leading from Paris-Montparnasse to Brest via Chartres, Nogent-le-Rotrou and Le Mans.

External links
 

Railway stations in Yvelines
Railway stations in France opened in 1849